The Chief of the Defence Staff (CDS) is the most senior appointment in the Sri Lankan Armed Forces, and the highest-ranking military officer in service, outranking the heads of each service branch. The CDS does not, however, have operational command authority over service branches, but  rather oversees inter-service co-operation and develops and implements the joint operations doctrine of the Sri Lankan armed forces. Coordination of inter-service joint operations are handled by the Office of the Chief of the Defence Staff formally known as the Joint Operations Headquarters.

The CDS is the Chairman of a Committee made up of service commanders and is a member of the National Security Council.

It's subordinate command is known as the Overall Operational Command.

History
The post could be traced back to post of general officer commanding (GOC) of the Joint Operations Command when General T. I. Weerathunga was first appointed to it on November 2, 1985. The Joint Operations Command was created in 1985 due to a need to co-ordinate of joint operations among the tri-services and the police with the escalation of the Sri Lankan Civil War. The post itself was created in 1999 replacing the civilian post of chief of the Joint Operations Bureau which had existed briefly in 1999.  Its powers expanded under the Chief of Defence Staff Act No. 35 of 2009.

In recent years, the Chief of the Defence Staff was appointed to the highest rank in the branch of the Sri Lankan armed forces to which he belonged (equivalent to a British "four-star" rank) being a General, an Admiral or an Air Chief Marshal. According to the new Bill, the president of Sri Lanka appoints to the post of Chief of Defence Staff any person presently serving as Commander of the Army, Navy or the Air Force, to function under the direction, supervision and control of the permanent secretary to the Ministry of Defence.

Responsibilities 
 Assist in providing for the strategic direction of the armed forces
 Development of doctrine for the joint employment of the armed forces
 Facilitation of preparation of strategic plans for the armed forces
 Co-ordination of matters relating to intelligence as between the armed forces; 
 To undertake assessments to determine the capabilities of the armed forces in comparison with those of their potential
 Preparation of operational plans for the armed forces

Supporting and associated posts
The CDS is assisted by a chief of staff (two-star rank) and four director generals (operations and systems, training, naval and air operations, coordination) making up the Office of the Chief of the Defence Staff. In addition, the CDS has a personal staff consisting of the secretary to the CDS, two aides-de-camp, and principal staff officers.

General officer commanding, Joint Operations Command (1985–1999)
General T. I. Weerathunga
General S. Cyril Ranatunga
General Hamilton Wanasinghe
Air Chief Marshal Walter Fernando

Chief of the Defence Staff (1999–present)
Ranks and honours are as at the completion of their tenure:

See also 
 Office of the Chief of the Defence Staff (Sri Lanka)
 National Security Council of Sri Lanka
 Commander of the Army
 Commander of the Navy
 Commander of the Air Force

References

External links 
 official website of the office of the chief of the defence staff
 Daluwatte given over-riding powers over services chiefs
 History

Military of Sri Lanka
Sri Lankan commands
Sri Lanka
Sri Lankan military appointments